Castlepollard GAA club is a Gaelic Athletic Association club located in Castlepollard, County Westmeath, Ireland. The club is almost exclusively concerned with the game of hurling and has a rich history in the game

Honours

 Westmeath Senior Hurling Championship (14): 1925,1928, 1933, 1934, 1936, 1937, 1961, 1965, 1966, 1974, 1995, 1997, 2003, 2005

External links
Castlepollard GAA site

Gaelic games clubs in County Westmeath
Hurling clubs in County Westmeath